Châteauneuf-du-Pape is a French wine, an Appellation d'origine contrôlée (AOC) located around the village of Châteauneuf-du-Pape in the Rhône wine region in southeastern France. It is one of the most renowned appellations of the southern part in the Rhône Valley, and its vineyards are located around Châteauneuf-du-Pape and in neighboring villages, Bédarrides, Courthézon and Sorgues, between Avignon and Orange.

History

Châteauneuf-du-Pape literally translates to "The Pope's new castle" and, indeed, the history of this appellation is firmly entwined with papal history. In 1309, Pope Clement V, former Archbishop of Bordeaux, relocated the papacy to the town of Avignon. Clement V and subsequent "Avignon Popes" were said to be great lovers of Burgundy wines and did much to promote them during the 70-year Avignon Papacy.

At the time, wine-growing around the town of Avignon was anything but illustrious. Prior to the Avignon Papacy, viticulture of that area had been initiated and maintained by the Bishops of Avignon but largely for local consumption.

John XXII, who succeeded Clement V, in addition to Burgundy wine, regularly drank wine from the vineyards to the north and did much to improve viticultural practices there. Under John XXII, the wines of this area came to be known as "Vin du Pape", this term later becoming "Châteauneuf-du-Pape". John XXII also built the castle which is the symbol of the appellation.

In the 18th century, the wines were shipped under the name vin d'Avignon. 

Records from the early 19th century mention wines of the name Châteauneuf-du-Pape-Calcernier which seems to have been a lighter-style wine than the Châteauneuf-du-Pape of today. They seem to have increased in reputation within France until phylloxera hit in the early 1870's which was earlier than most other French wine regions were affected. Prior to World War I, the bulk of Châteauneuf-du-Pape was sold to Burgundy as vin de médecine to be added to Burgundy wine to boost the strength and alcohol levels.

Early AOC regulations

In the early 20th century, Châteauneuf-du-Pape was plagued by wine fraud; various rules for the production of Châteauneuf-du-Pape, drawn up and promulgated in 1923, were the first Appellation Contrôlée rules in France and provided the prototype for subsequent AOC rules. The original AOC rules allowed ten varieties, were amended to thirteen in 1936  and eighteen in 2009. Baron Pierre le Roy of Château Fortia was the principal architect of these regulations which set the minimum alcohol level of the wines and set limits on yields as well as which types of grapes could be grown in which areas. 

Another of the baron's requirements was that no vineyards were to be planted on land that was not arid enough to support plantings of both lavender and thyme.

In 1954, there was a media sensation as local stories claimed that "flying cigars", or UFOs similar to flying saucers, had been spotted above Châteauneuf-du-Pape and that aliens were interested in their wine. Local politicians, said to be sensing an opportunity to promote the region's wines, passed a law banning flying cigars from entering their airspace or landing on their territory, a law which remains in effect to this day.<ref>F. Prial "WINE; "Identified Flying Object" The New York Times Jan 4, 1987</ref> The legend has become lore among wine aficionados, and the wine Cigare Volant (French for "flying cigar"), in production since 1984, is named after the tale.

 Climate and geography 
The appellation stretches from the eastern bank of the Rhône near Orange in the north-west to Sorgues near Avignon in the south-east. The altitude reaches 120 meters at its highest, in the northern part of the appellation. It covers 3200 hectares of land with at least three distinct types of soil or terroirs. In the north and north-east the famous galets roulés, round rocks or pebbles, cover the clay soil. The rocks are famous for retaining the heat from the plentiful sun, some 2800 hours a year, releasing it at night, ripening the grapes faster than in the eastern part of the appellation, where the soil is mostly sand, or the south, where the soil is more gritty. The powerful mistral wind carries away the moisture, intensifying the dry climate.

 Terroir 
The characteristic terroir of Châteauneuf-du-Pape comes from a layer of stones called Galets roulés ("pebbles"). The rocks are typically quartzite and remnants of Alpine glaciers that have been smoothed over millennia by the Rhône. The stone retains heat during the day and releases it at night which can have an effect of hastening the ripening of grapes. The stones can also serve as a protective layer to help retain moisture in the soil during the dry summer months. Some of the most prestigious vineyards in the area, like Château Rayas, have more traditional looking vineyards without the galets. These are most often vineyards located on south-facing slopes where the night-time radiated heat from the stones would be detrimental to the vines and cause overripening of the grapes.

La Crau
La Crau is one of Châteauneuf-du-Pape's most famous lieux-dits vineyards. The vineyard is owned primarily by Domaine du Vieux Télégraphe, one of the most classic Châteauneufs, but also producer Henri Bonneau maintains a firm position here. The vineyard is very rich in the aforementioned galets roulés, while Domaine du Vieux Lazaret with its over 100 hectares owned by Vignobles Jérôme Quiot is the largest.

Wine

Châteauneuf-du-Pape can be either red or white wine, but the large majority of the wines produced are red. The appellation rules did not until recently allow production of rosé.

The wines have traditionally been packaged in distinctive heavy dark wine bottles embossed with papal regalia and insignia. However, in recent times a number of producers have dropped the full papal seal in favour of a more generic icon, while still retaining the same heavy glassware.

Grape varieties

Châteauneuf-du-Pape traditionally has had thirteen grape varieties, but the 2009 version of the AOC rules changed that list to eighteen varieties, since blanc (white), rose (pink) and noir (black) versions of some grapes are now explicitly listed as separate varieties. Also in the previous version of the appellation rules, Grenache and Picpoul were associated with different pruning regulations in their noir and blanc versions, bringing the number of varieties previously mentioned from thirteen to fifteen.INAO: Appellation rules for Châteauneuf-du-Pape last updated March 28, 1993  (superseded by the 2009 version)

Red varieties allowed are Cinsault, Counoise, Grenache noir, Mourvèdre, Muscardin, Piquepoul noir, Syrah, Terret noir, and Vaccarèse (Brun Argenté). White and pink varieties are Bourboulenc, Clairette blanche, Clairette rose, Grenache blanc, Grenache gris, Picardan, Piquepoul blanc, Piquepoul gris, and Roussanne. (The varieties not specifically mentioned before 2009 are Clairette rose, Grenache gris and Piquepoul gris.)

Both red and white varieties are allowed in both red and white Châteauneuf-du-Pape. There are no restrictions as to the proportion of grape varieties to be used, and unlike the case with other appellations, the allowed grape varieties are not differentiated into principal varieties and accessory varieties. Thus, it is theoretically possible to produce varietal Châteauneuf-du-Pape from any of the eighteen allowed varieties. In reality, most Châteauneuf-du-Pape wines are blends dominated by Grenache. Only one of every 16 bottles produced in the region contains white wine.

With 72% of the total vineyard surface in 2004, Grenache noir is very dominant, followed by Syrah at 10.5% and Mourvèdre at 7%, both of which have expanded in recent decades. Cinsaut, Clairette, Grenache blanc, Roussanne and Bourboulenc each cover 1-2.5%, and the remaining seven varieties each account for 0.5% or less.

It is common to grow the vines as gobelets and this is the only vine training system allowed for the first four red varieties. Yields are restricted to two tons per acre.

Red wines

In most red Châteauneuf-du-Pape, Grenache noir is the most common variety, although some producers use a higher proportion of Mourvèdre. Grenache produces a sweet juice that can have almost a jam-like consistency when very ripe. Syrah is typically blended to provide color and spice, while Mourvèdre can add elegance and structure to the wine. Some estates produce varietal (100%) Grenache noir, while a few producers insist on using at least a token amount of all thirteen originally permitted varieties in their blend. One of the only estates to grow all these varieties and use them consistently in a blend is Château de Beaucastel.

Châteauneuf-du-Pape red wines are often described as earthy with gamey flavors that have hints of tar and leather. The wines are considered tough and tannic in their youth but maintain their rich spiciness as they age. The wines often exhibit aromas of dried herbs common in Provence under the name of garrigue. Châteauneuf-du-Pape dominated by Mourvèdre tend to be higher in tannin and requiring longer cellaring before being approachable.

White wines
White Châteauneuf-du-Pape is produced by excluding the red varieties and only using the six permitted white varieties. The white varieties account for 7 percent of total plantings according to 2004 statistics, and a portion of the whites grapes are blended into red wines, which means that white wine production only accounts for around 5 percent of the total. In white Châteauneuf-du-Pape, Grenache blanc and Roussanne provides fruitiness and fatness to the blend while Bourboulenc, Clairette and Picpoul add acidity, floral and mineral notes. The style of these wines range from lean and minerally to oily and rich with a variety of aromas and flavor notes—including almond, star fruit, anise, fennel, honeysuckle and peach. A single varietal, Roussanne, that is matured in an oak aging barrel, is also made by some estates. Most whites are made to be drunk young. Some white Châteauneuf-du-Pape are meant to age and tend to develop exotic aromas and scents of orange peels after 7–8 years.

Winemaking styles

Châteauneuf-du-Pape wines are often high in alcohol, typically 14-15.5%, and must be minimum 12.5% under the appellation rules with no chaptalization allowed. Winemaking in the region tends to focus on balancing the high sugar levels in the grape with the tannins and phenols that are common in red Châteauneuf-du-Pape. Following harvest, the grape clusters are rarely destemmed prior to fermentation. The fermentation temperatures are kept high, with the skins being frequently pumped over and punched down for the benefit of tannin levels and color extraction to achieve the characteristic dark Châteauneuf color. Beginning in the 1970s, market tendencies to prefer lighter, fruitier wines that can be drunk sooner have prompted some estates to experiment with carbonic maceration. Low yields are considered critical to the success of Châteauneuf-du-Pape with the principal grape varieties tending to make thin and bland wine when produced in higher quantities. The AOC requirements limit yields to 368 gallons per acre, which is nearly half the yields allowed in Bordeaux.

The common technique of using small barrel oak is not widely used in the Châteauneuf-du-Pape area, partly due to the fact that the principal grape Grenache is prone to oxidation in the porous wooden barrels. Instead, Grenache is vinified in large cement tanks, while the other grape varieties are made in large old barrels called foudres that do not impart the same "oaky" characteristics as the smaller oak barrels.

Popular culture

In Truth and Advertising, a 19th season episode of the animated television comedy South Park (TV series) Skeeter tells Randy, "Alright Randy, you should probably lay off the old vine Châteauneuf-du-Pape!"

In Anchorman 2: The Legend Continues, the title character states that "I drank half a bottle of ketchup thinking it was Châteauneuf-du-Pape!" after he was stricken blind in a skating accident.

The Beastie Boys rap song "Body Movin'" contains the lyrics "Like a bottle of Châteauneuf-du-Pape / I'm fine like wine when I start to rap."

Richard Castle, the lead character on the TV drama Castle, mentions Châteauneuf-du-Pape on several occasions as a wine he drinks or gives as a gift.

In Sorry, Bro, a fourth-season episode of How I Met Your Mother, Ted's high school girlfriend Karen informs the waiter that the Châteauneuf-du-Pape has been mistakenly listed as a Provence wine.

In the comedy Frasier, Frasier Crane frequently orders Châteauneuf-du-Pape at French restaurants, including at Le Cigare Volante, a regularly visited restaurant named after Châteauneuf-du-Pape's "flying cigar" legend.

In Cheers, Frasier Crane mentions Châteauneuf-du-Pape as he waxes poetically to Sam Malone during the season 7 episode “Please Mr. Postman”.

In The M*A*S*H Olympics, a sixth-season episode of the television comedy MASH, Capt. Benjamin Franklin "Hawkeye" Pierce and Capt. B.J. Hunnicutt threaten to wash their dirty socks in Maj. Charles Emerson Winchester's Châteauneuf-du-Pape if he does not help them finish the calisthenics ordered by Col. Sherman Potter.

In "Out of Gas", a seventh-season episode of the television comedy MASH, Major Charles Emerson Winchester attempts to trade a case of Châteauneuf-du-Pape for sodium pentothal.

In The Magician King by Lev Grossman, the members of the Murs safe house celebrate Julia's 250th magic level with a special dinner and a bottle of expensive Châteauneuf-du-Pape.

In Only Fools and Horses, the character Del Boy incorrectly uses the phrase Châteauneuf-du-Pape reserved for an explosive situation

In American Horror Story Hotel, the character Iris, played by Kathy Bates, use a bottle of Châteauneuf-du-Pape Grenache Blanc to top off the nutrition blend for the two Swedish woman.

In the 1971 spaghetti western Trinity Is Still My Name, Bud Spencer and Terrence Hill are treated to a bottle of Chateauneuf du Pape when indulging in an eating orgy at a fine French restaurant.

In Good Omens, Crowley and Azriaphale drink Châteauneuf-du-Pape at the bookshop together.

In A Gentleman in Moscow'' by Amor Towles, the Soviets remove the labels from all red wines because they should be equal. Towles' hero, Count Rostov, goes to the hotel cellar where all the wine is kept and identifies the Chateauneuf-du-Pape by feeling for the embossed papal insignia, and reserves them for himself.

In the Apple TV+ show Servant Season 1 Episode 8, the character Julian, played by Rupert Grint, exclaims, "He opened the Neuf-du-Pape. I can smell it."

References

External links
 Site des Vins d'AOC Côtes du Rhône
 Chateauneuf.com Main website of boutique shop in Châteauneuf du Pape that stocks wine from most of the local producers
 chateauneuf.dk  Non commercial website with information about producers of Châteauneuf du Pape

Rhône wine AOCs

de:Châteauneuf-du-Pape#Der Wein